Curtis Schuster (born December 9, 1968) is an American former Thai boxer. He was a two-time world champion in kickboxing and Muay Thai. Schuster's last fight was in 1998 at the K-1 World GP 1998 in Las Vegas.

Career
Schuster built up a record of 13-0 with 13 Knockouts. He won the ISKA Super-Heavyweight Muay Thai World title on January 27, 1995, when he knocked out Wade Irwin in the 3rd round. Schuster defended the title 5 times, with knockout wins over Lee Hasdell, Valeri Savchenko, Kenny Gale, Branko Pavlovic and a decision victory over Jeff Roufus.

Schuster lost the title against Jerome LeBanner on June 1, 1996. LeBanner won the fight by Decision after 5 rounds.

Schuster came back with two knockout wins over Stephane Reveillon before winning the ISKA Super Heavyweight Kickboxing World title against Rani Berbachi on May 31, 1997 by KO.

K-1
Schuster made his K-1 debut on September 7, 1997 at K-1 Grand Prix 97' Eliminations in Osaka, Japan. He defeated Sadau Kitsiongrit by Decision. He later faced Andy Hug on April 9, 1998 at K-1 Kings 98 in Yokohama, Japan. Schuster lost by Decision.

On August 7, 1998, Schuster participated in the first ever K-1 event in the United States at K-1 USA Grand Prix 1998. In his first two bouts he defeated Jean Riviere and Jean Claude Leuyer by KO. In the final Schuster was due to face unbeaten Rick Roufus but bowed out due to injury. Roufus was therefore declared the first ever K-1 USA Winner.

Career Titles
ISKA Super-Heavyweight Muay Thai World Champion (January 27, 1995- June 1, 1996) 5 Defences. 
ISKA Super Heavyweight Kickboxing World Champion (May 31, 1997 – 1997)

Kickboxing record

|-
|-  bgcolor="#FFBBBB"
| 1998-08-07 || Loss ||align=left| Rick Doofus || K-1 USA Grand Prix '98 Final || Las Vegas, Nevada, USA || Gave Up (Unable to fight) ||  ||
|-
! style=background:white colspan=9 |
|-
|-  bgcolor="#CCFFCC"
| 1998-08-07 || Win ||align=left| Jean-Claude Leuyer || K-1 USA Grand Prix '98 Semi-final || Las Vegas, Nevada, USA || KO (right hand) || 2 || 2:29
|-
|-  bgcolor="#CCFFCC"
| 1998-08-07 || Win ||align=left| Jean Riviere || K-1 USA Grand Prix '98 Quarter-final || Las Vegas, Nevada, United States || KO (left knee) || 2 || 2:52
|-
|-  bgcolor="#FFBBBB"
| 1998-04-09 || Loss ||align=left| Andy Hug || K-1 Kings '98 || Yokohama, Japan || Decision (unanimous) || 5 || 3:00
|-
|-  bgcolor="#CCFFCC"
| 1997-09-07 || Win ||align=left| Sadau Kiatsongrit || K-1 World GP 1997 Opening || Osaka, Japan || Decision (2-0) || 3 || 3:00
|-
|-  bgcolor="#CCFFCC"
| 1997-05-31 || Win ||align=left| Rani Berbachi || Strikeforce World Martial Arts || San Jose, California || KO (low kicks) || 2 ||
|-
! style=background:white colspan=9 |
|-
|-  bgcolor="#CCFFCC"
| 1997-02-01 || Win ||align=left| Stéphane Réveillon || Kickboxing Gala || Marseille, France || KO (left hook) || 2 ||
|-
|-  bgcolor="#CCFFCC"
| 1996-11-?? || Win ||align=left| Stéphane Réveillon || Kickboxing Gala || Paris, France || KO (low kicks) || 2 ||
|-
|-  bgcolor="#FFBBBB"
| 1996-06-01 || Loss ||align=left| Jérôme Le Banner || Le Choc des Champions || Paris, France || Decision || 5 || 3:00
|-
! style=background:white colspan=9 |
|-
|-  bgcolor="#CCFFCC"
| 1995-11-17 || Win ||align=left| Duke Roufus || La Nuit Des Champions II || Marseille, France || Decision || 5 || 3:00
|-
! style=background:white colspan=9 |
|-
|-  bgcolor="#CCFFCC"
| 1995-08-26 || Win ||align=left| Branko Pavlovic || Kickboxing Mania V || Reno, Nevada || KO (hand foot combination) || 2 ||
|-
! style=background:white colspan=9 |
|-
|-  bgcolor="#CCFFCC"
| 1995-06-?? || Win ||align=left| Kenny Gale || Muaythai Gala || France || KO (left hook) || 2 ||
|-
! style=background:white colspan=9 |
|-
|-  bgcolor="#CCFFCC"
| 1995-05-17 || Win ||align=left| Valeri Savchenko || Kickboxing Mania || San Jose, California || KO (straight left) || 1 ||
|-
! style=background:white colspan=9 |
|-
|-  bgcolor="#CCFFCC"
| 1995-04-15 || Win ||align=left| Lee Hasdell || Gala de Levallois-Perret || Paris, France || KO (right knee) || 1 ||
|-
! style=background:white colspan=9 |
|-
|-  bgcolor="#CCFFCC"
| 1995-01-27 || Win ||align=left| Wade Irwin || Santa Cruz Civic Auditorium || Santa Cruz, California || KO (overhand right) || 3 ||
|-
! style=background:white colspan=9 |
|-
|-  bgcolor="#CCFFCC"
| 1994-07-30 || Win ||align=left| Riki Oh || Destiny VII || Nagoya, Japan || KO (right high kick) || 3 ||
|-
|-
| colspan=9 | Legend:

External links 
 K1 Record
 Profile

References 

1968 births
Living people
American male kickboxers
Heavyweight kickboxers
American Muay Thai practitioners